Liopinus incognitus is a species of beetle in the family Cerambycidae. It was described by Lewis in 1977.

References

Acanthocinini
Beetles described in 1977